Final Fantasy VII is a role-playing video game developed by Square (now Square Enix) and published by Sony Computer Entertainment as the seventh installment in the Final Fantasy series. Released in 1997, the game sparked the release of a collection of media centered on the game entitled the Compilation of Final Fantasy VII. The music of the Final Fantasy VII series includes not only the soundtrack to the original game and its associated albums, but also the soundtracks and music albums released for the other titles in the collection. The first album produced was Final Fantasy VII Original Soundtrack, a compilation of all the music in the game. It was released as a soundtrack album on four CDs by DigiCube in 1997. A selection of tracks from the album was released in the single-disc Reunion Tracks by DigiCube the same year. Piano Collections Final Fantasy VII, an album featuring piano arrangements of pieces from the soundtrack, was released in 2003 by DigiCube, and Square Enix began reprinting all three albums in 2004. To date, these are the only released albums based on the original game's soundtrack, and were solely composed by regular series composer Nobuo Uematsu; his role for the majority of subsequent albums has been filled by Masashi Hamauzu and Takeharu Ishimoto.

The Compilation of Final Fantasy VII began eight years after the release of Final Fantasy VII with the release of the animated film sequel Advent Children in 2005. The soundtracks for each of the titles in the collection are included in an album, starting with the album release of the soundtrack to Advent Children that year. The following year, Nippon Crown released a soundtrack album to correspond with the video game Dirge of Cerberus, while Square Enix launched a download-only collection of music from the multiplayer mode of the game, which was only released in Japan. After the launch of the game Crisis Core in 2007, Warner Music Japan produced the title's soundtrack. The latest album in the collection, Before Crisis: Final Fantasy VII & Last Order: Final Fantasy VII Original Soundtrack, was released by Square Enix the same year as a combined soundtrack album for the game Before Crisis and the animated movie Last Order.

The original music received highly positive reviews from critics, who found many of the tunes to be memorable and noted the emotional intensity of several of the tracks. The reception for the other albums has been mixed, with reactions ranging from enthusiastic praise to disappointment. Several pieces from the soundtrack, particularly "One-Winged Angel" and "Aeris' Theme", remain popular and have been performed numerous times in orchestral concert series such as Dear Friends: Music from Final Fantasy and Tour de Japon: Music from Final Fantasy. Music from the Original Soundtrack has been included in arranged albums and compilations by Square as well as outside groups.

Creation and development

Nobuo Uematsu composed the music of Final Fantasy VII in less than one year, matching the game's development time, although he had taken two years to create the soundtrack for the previous title, Final Fantasy VI. Final Fantasy VII was the first game in the series to be developed for the PlayStation, and while the media capabilities of the console allowed for pre-recorded Linear PCM (often as Red Book audio tracks on the CD), it was decided to generate the music in real time on the console instead, using samples and note data. This decision has been credited as giving the soundtrack "a very distinctive mood and feel", forming a strong association for listeners between the game and its soundtrack. Uematsu had initially planned to use vocal performances for the game to take advantage of the console's capabilities, but found that the advanced audio quality required in turn made the game have much longer loading times in each area. Uematsu decided that the quality was not worth the effects on gameplay, though after the release and seeing Suikoden II (1998, PlayStation), which had used higher-quality music instead, he reversed his stance for Final Fantasy VIII. There was a plan to use a "famous vocalist" for the ending theme to the game as a "theme song" for the game, but time constraints and thematic concerns, caused the idea to be dropped. Uematsu has claimed, however, that the move into the "PlayStation era", which allowed video game composers to use sounds recorded in the studio rather than from synthesizers, had "definitely been the biggest change" to video game music.

Uematsu's approach to composing the game's music was to treat it like a film soundtrack and compose songs that reflected the mood of the scenes rather than trying to make strong melodies to "define the game", as he felt that approach would come across too strong when placed alongside the game's new 3D visuals. As an example, he composed the track intended for the scene in the game where Aerith Gainsborough is killed to be "sad but beautiful", rather than more overtly emotional, creating what he feels is a more understated feeling. Uematsu has additionally said that the soundtrack has a feel of "realism", which also prevented him from using "exorbitant, crazy music". The first piece that Uematsu composed for the game was the opening theme; game director Yoshinori Kitase showed him the opening cinematic to the game and asked him to begin the project there. The track was well received in the company, which gave Uematsu "a sense that it was going to be a really good project". He later stated in the liner notes for the soundtrack album that the music for Final Fantasy VII was his "greatest harvest" to date.

Final Fantasy VII was the first game in the series to include a track with digitized vocals, "One-Winged Angel". The track has been called Uematsu's "most recognizable contribution" to the music of the Final Fantasy series, though the composer did not expect it to gain such popularity. The piece, described as "a fanfare to impending doom", is said to not "follow any normal genre rules" and has been termed "possibly the most innovative idea in the series' musical history". Uematsu approached the piece, which accompanies the final battle of the game, in a different manner than previous "boss tracks": as he felt that using his normal approach would cause unfavorable comparisons to his well-received Final Fantasy VI boss tracks, he instead tried to take a different approach. Inspired by The Rite of Spring by Igor Stravinsky to make a more "classical" track, and by rock and roll music from the late 1960s and early 1970s to make an orchestral track with a "destructive impact", he spent two weeks composing short unconnected musical phrases, and then arranged them together into a song, an approach he has never used before or since. The lyrics of "One-Winged Angel", a Latin choral track that plays at the climax of the game, were taken from the medieval poetry that forms the basis of Carl Orff's Carmina Burana, specifically "Estuans Interius", "O Fortuna", "Veni, Veni, Venias" and "Ave Formosissima". Uematsu has stated that the intro of "One-Winged Angel" is based on Jimi Hendrix's "Purple Haze", that the piece revolves around the image of Sephiroth, and that despite the chorus and orchestra, he still thinks of it as a "rock piece". He said in a 2005 interview that "One-Winged Angel" is his favorite tune from the soundtrack, and in 2004 that it was his favorite battle theme from any Final Fantasy game.

Final Fantasy VII albums

Original Soundtrack

Final Fantasy VII Original Soundtrack is a soundtrack album containing musical tracks from the game, composed by Nobuo Uematsu and produced by Uematsu and Minoru Akao. It was originally released on February 10, 1997 through DigiCube and later reissued directly by Square Enix on May 10, 2004. The soundtrack spans 85 tracks over four discs and has a combined duration of 4:39:53. A limited edition was produced along with the original album, containing illustrated liner notes with several pictures of Uematsu's workspace and personal effects, various cutscenes and in-game screen shots from the game, and a discography.

The soundtrack covers a wide variety of musical genres, including rock, techno, orchestral, and choral, although the soundtrack as a whole is primarily orchestral. While many of the tracks were intended as background music, reviewers noted the emotional intensity of several tracks, especially "Aerith's Theme", which plays during a moment described as "the most shocking moment in video games", and has been described as the most memorable track from the album. The theme has become popular among fans, and has inspired various arrangements. Other notable tracks include "Main Theme of Final Fantasy VII". Themes from this track play during several other tunes from the soundtrack, such as "Words Drowned by Fireworks", to tie the soundtrack together.

The regular edition of the album reached No. 3 on the Japan Oricon charts, while the limited edition reached No. 19. Overall, the album sold 148,000 copies as of January 2010, with the limited edition selling a further 21,000. The album was well received by critics. Allmusic awarded Uematsu's original soundtrack a five-star rating. Ben Schweitzer of RPGFan claimed that "for the most part, it's a diamond", with his primary complaint being the quality of the MIDI sound. He found the tracks to be "beautiful" and said that "One-Winged Angel" was "possibly the most innovative idea in the series' musical history". Patrick Gann of RPGFan concurred and found all of the soundtrack's tunes to be "memorable" and the Original Soundtrack to be "very worth the purchase". Philip of Square Enix Music Online, however, disliked the sound quality of the soundtrack and saw several tracks as "trivial", though he did note that Uematsu "has a flair for strong, memorable" pieces. In 2006, IGN ranked the album as the best Final Fantasy soundtrack to date and cited the "gripping" character themes and "One-Winged Angel" in particular as contributing factors. They also named "One-Winged Angel" as the best piece of music from the entire Final Fantasy series.

The original CDs for both releases were only published in Japan and include only Japanese track names. The official English track names were later added to digital releases of the soundtrack.

Track listing

Reunion Tracks

Final Fantasy VII Reunion Tracks is a single-disc album that comprises a selection of tracks from Final Fantasy VII Original Soundtrack. It was initially released through DigiCube on October 22, 1997 and later reissued by Square Enix on February 23, 2005. While the record was never published outside Japan, the music is available in the North American iTunes Store. All of the pieces are the same as on the Original Soundtrack except for "Main Theme of Final Fantasy VII", "One-Winged Angel", and "Aerith's Theme", which were re-recorded with an orchestra and choir. Some versions of the album also contain a hidden pregap track, which can be accessed by rewinding from the start of the album. This track is an instrumental version of "One-Winged Angel" without the choir. The new arrangements were created by Shirō Hamaguchi. The album spans 1:12:24 over 19 tracks.

Final Fantasy VII Reunion Tracks reached No. 20 on the Japan Oricon charts, and sold over 25,600 copies. It received mixed reviews. Gann liked the newly orchestrated tracks, calling them "incredibly well-done orchestrations", and said that "depending on how willing you are to spend money" they made the album worth purchasing on their own, although he felt the other tracks offered nothing new to owners of the original soundtrack. Chris of Square Enix Music Online, however, felt that while the orchestrated tracks were well-done, the selection of the other tracks was poor and that the album as a whole was "a lousy purchase for most who enjoyed Final Fantasy VIIs score".

Piano Collections
Piano Collections Final Fantasy VII is an album featuring piano arrangements of selected Final Fantasy VII pieces composed by Nobuo Uematsu, arranged by Shirō Hamaguchi, and performed by Seiji Honda. The album was released through DigiCube on December 3, 2003 and later reissued by Square Enix on May 10, 2004. It covers a duration of 47:37 over 13 tracks. The album includes light-hearted tracks as well as slower, more emotional pieces, covering a variety of genres such as marches, new-age themes, and jazz. Unlike previous and subsequent Final Fantasy piano albums, Piano Collections Final Fantasy VII was produced many years after the release of the original game. As three of the tracks from this album were reused in the soundtrack to Final Fantasy VII: Advent Children, it has been speculated that the album was produced with the intention to provide tunes for Advent Children.

Piano Collections Final Fantasy VII reached No. 228 on the Japan Oricon charts, selling 1,200 copies, and was well received by reviewers, with Gann raving that the pieces were fun to listen to, the performer was "amazing", the choice of tracks was "excellent", and the album as a whole was a "spectacular CD". Sophia of Soundtrack Central concurred and stated that the album was "quite fulfilling to listen to" and that it surpassed her expectations.

Final Fantasy VII Remake
In 2020 Square Enix released Final Fantasy VII Remake, the first section of a multi-episode remake of Final Fantasy VII. A seven-disc, 156-track, 8:34:28 soundtrack album, Final Fantasy VII Remake Original Soundtrack, was released on May 27, with a special edition adding an eighth 1:07:16 disc with an additional 24 tracks from the jukebox feature in the game. The soundtrack contains arrangements of Uematsu's music from the original game, along with new compositions by Masashi Hamauzu and others.

Compilation albums

Advent Children
Final Fantasy VII: Advent Children is the 2005 CGI film sequel to the original game, and the beginning of the Compilation of Final Fantasy VII. Its soundtrack album, Final Fantasy VII Advent Children Original Soundtrack, was released on September 28, 2005, containing new material created specifically for the film, as well as arrangements of tunes from the Final Fantasy VII soundtrack. Both the original tracks and the arrangements cover a variety of musical styles, including orchestral, choral, classical piano, and rock music; Variety noted that the styles vary between "sparse piano noodlings, pop metal thrashings and cloying power ballads". The tracks were composed by Nobuo Uematsu, Keiji Kawamori, Kenichiro Fukui, and Tsuyoshi Sekito, and arranged by Fukui, Sekito, Kawamori, Shirō Hamaguchi, and Kazuhiko Toyama. Upon hearing each track, Nomura would make some changes, and have the composers re-record the piece. The song "Calling" from 1989 by former Boøwy vocalist Kyosuke Himuro was used in the film's credits. Some of the piano tracks are longer than what was included in the film. The album spans 26 tracks on two discs, covering a duration of 1:21:41. In addition to the regular release, a limited edition was produced with a foil slipcover and a booklet of credits and lyrics. The soundtrack album reached position #15 on the Japanese Oricon music charts, and stayed on the charts for 10 weeks.

A mini-album titled Final Fantasy VII Advent Children Complete Mini Album was released on April 10, 2009 to coincide with the release of the Final Fantasy VII Advent Children Complete version of the film. The new release of the film included a new ending theme, "Safe and Sound", by Kyosuke Himuro and My Chemical Romance singer Gerard Way, and replaced "Water" with a new song, "Anxious Heart". The mini-album was five tracks and 29:17 long.  The included tracks on the album were new versions of "The Chase of Highway", "Those Who Fight Further", "Sign", "Advent: One-Winged Angel", and "On the Way to a Smile", a piece from the Final Fantasy VII-based anime On the Way to a Smile. A larger album, Final Fantasy VII Advent Children Complete: Reunion Tracks, was released with 21 tracks on September 16 the same year. This album contains the tracks from the mini-album, as well as several pieces that were lengthened for the Complete film version but not rearranged. Reunion Tracks appeared on the Oricon charts for a single week at position #108.

Final Fantasy VII Advent Children Original Soundtrack sold over 38,900 copies, and was well received by critics. Gann said that Final Fantasy fans have "no excuse" not to buy the album and noted that his only disappointments were that three of the tracks were the same as on the Piano Collections album, and that as a film score, some of the shifts in the pieces make less sense outside of the context of the visuals. Chris Carle of IGN called it a "jagged but beautiful blend of opera, metal and electronica", and a "richly-layered, complex and utterly listenable soundtrack" while praising the variety of musical styles used and the quality of the pieces. In contrast to Gann, he felt that "divorced from the film, the score is still amazingly listenable".

Track listing

Dirge of Cerberus
Dirge of Cerberus: Final Fantasy VII was released for the PlayStation 2 in January 2006, and its soundtrack, Dirge of Cerberus: Final Fantasy VII Original Soundtrack, was released a month later. The tracks were composed by Masashi Hamauzu and orchestrations were provided by Yoshihisa Hirano, making it the first Final Fantasy VII-related soundtrack to not include new material from Nobuo Uematsu. Koji Haishima conducted the Tokyo Philharmonic Orchestra, which performed the music for around half of the album. The soundtrack also contains the songs "Longing" and "Redemption" by Japanese musician and actor Gackt, and was released through the artist's ex label, Nippon Crown. The album contains a mix of orchestral and rock tracks, with some orchestral performances of slow compositions and marches and both styles of music used for faster-paced "threatening" and "dynamic" tunes. GameSpot describes the music as ranging from "quiet, almost nonexistent ambient tunes to dramatic, orchestrated tracks". The album was launched on February 15, 2006, and spans 53 tracks over two discs, covering a duration of 2:14:22. The limited edition of the soundtrack includes a case which is designed to hold the soundtrack, along with the game disc and the limited edition of the "Redemption" single and associated DVD, although these other albums must be purchased separately.

Dirge of Cerberus: Final Fantasy VII Original Soundtrack was given mixed reviews from critics. Gann called it "solid, [...], but not awe-inspiring" and dismissed the limited edition extras as not worth the purchase. Eduardo of Square Enix Music Online, however, described it as "nearly perfect" and said that he "can, and will, run out of positive adjectives to describe the Dirge of Cerberus Final Fantasy VII Original Soundtrack. It's a work of genius". The album reached position #19 on the Oricon charts, and sold over 14,300 copies; the "Redemption" single sold over 125,000 copies.

Track listing

Dirge of Cerberus Multiplayer Mode
The Japanese version of Dirge of Cerberus included a multiplayer mode absent from other releases, which contained music tracks not used in the single-player game. Dirge of Cerberus: Final Fantasy VII Multiplayer Mode Original Sound Collections is a download-only soundtrack album for the multiplayer tracks released through the Japanese iTunes Store and the Square Enix Music Download website on August 22, 2006. It spans 1:07:07 over 27 tracks. The soundtrack includes all the music from the multiplayer mode and some music from the single-player game which did not appear on the previous soundtrack album, including two tracks composed by Ryo Yamazaki for the North American release of the game.

Eduardo of Square Enix Music Online also appreciated Dirge of Cerberus: Final Fantasy VII Multiplayer Mode Original Sound Collections, saying that it accented the Original Soundtrack well and that "Hamauzu and Yamazaki have delivered strongly and, with a decent mix of electronica, orchestral music, and rock, the entirety of the Dirge of Cerberus musical experience cannot be missed".

Crisis Core
Crisis Core: Final Fantasy VII Original Soundtrack is the soundtrack of the game Crisis Core: Final Fantasy VII. It was released on October 10, 2007 by Warner Music Japan and covers 55 tracks over two discs with a total duration of 2:20:59. The music was primarily composed by Takeharu Ishimoto, with a few tracks provided by Kazuhiko Toyama. It was Ishimoto's second major work, after the soundtrack to The World Ends with You; the only titles he had composed for previously were World Fantasista, a little-known soccer game for which he was a co-composer, and the cell phone game Before Crisis: Final Fantasy VII. The tracks composed by Ishimoto cover a range of moods, from "harsh and in-your-face" to "stunning and lovely", but were primarily used as ambient background music. The soundtrack also includes a large number of arrangements of tunes from the original Final Fantasy VII score, as well as a theme song entitled "Why", performed by Ayaka. A variety of musical instruments were used for the soundtrack, including piano and synthesizers, but critics noted that Ishimoto used guitars, both electronic and acoustic, more and better than any previous Final Fantasy soundtrack.

Crisis Core: Final Fantasy VII Original Soundtrack sold over 13,300 copies, while "Why" sold 60,000 copies. It received mixed reviews by critics, with Don of Square Enix Music Online stating that while some of Ishimoto's and all of Toyama's arrangements were excellent, the original pieces that made up the bulk of the album offered "very little that is actually worth a listen". Gann was more lenient, praising Ishimoto for writing "an excellent soundtrack" and being especially happy with the quality of the arrangements of Uematsu's pieces. Gann did, however, note that because Ishimoto's original works were more ambient, his arrangements, and by extension Uematsu's work, far outshone his own new contributions. He also felt that the theme song "Why" was "generic" and "bland". Sophia Tong of IGN described the album as a "mixed bag", stating that some of the arrangements and new tracks were "fantastic" while others were "not all that compelling", and lamented the overuse of a few themes throughout the soundtrack.

Track listing

Before Crisis and Last Order
Before Crisis: Final Fantasy VII & Last Order: Final Fantasy VII Original Soundtrack is the combined soundtrack album of the original video animation Last Order: Final Fantasy VII and the game Before Crisis: Final Fantasy VII. Before Crisis serves as a prequel to Final Fantasy VII while Last Order is a side story to Final Fantasy VII, showing some of the same story elements from Crisis Core and Final Fantasy VII from an alternate viewpoint. The album spans 27 tracks, of which the first 12 are from the game and the remainder are from the animation. The album was released on December 19, 2007 by Square Enix, and was mainly composed by Ishimoto, with some tunes based on works from Final Fantasy VII by Uematsu. Many of the pieces composed for the two works were used either directly or in an arranged form in Crisis Core. As this soundtrack album was released after the soundtrack to Crisis Core, these pieces were generally not included in the Before Crisis album. The album covers a duration of 63:48.

Before Crisis: Final Fantasy VII & Last Order: Final Fantasy VII Original Soundtrack was poorly received by critics. Gann said that "the whole album is a flop compared to the quality composition of Crisis Core" and that the contents of the album were "the leftovers, B-Sides, and less-impressive tracks from Ishimoto's arsenal of FFVII music", especially as many tracks were used in the Crisis Core soundtrack and not repeated in this album. Chris (also known as "Dark Cloud") of Square Enix Music Online agreed and recommended it only for listeners who like "loud music without much creativity".

Legacy
The Black Mages, a now defunct band led by Nobuo Uematsu that arranged music from the Final Fantasy series into a rock music style, has arranged four pieces from Final Fantasy VII. These are "J-E-N-O-V-A" and "Those Who Fight Further" from The Black Mages, published in 2003, "Advent One-Winged Angel" from Final Fantasy VII Advent Children Original Soundtrack and "Opening ~ Bombing Mission" from Darkness and Starlight, published in 2008. Music from Final Fantasy VII has also been used in other games, such as the fighting game Ehrgeiz, Kingdom Hearts series, and the Super Smash Bros. series.

Uematsu continues to perform certain pieces in the Dear Friends -Music from Final Fantasy- concert series. The music of Final Fantasy VII has also appeared in various official concerts and live albums, such as 20020220 Music from Final Fantasy, a live recording of an orchestra performing music from the series including "Aerith's Theme" and "One-Winged Angel". Additionally, several pieces from the game were performed by the New Japan Philharmonic Orchestra in the Tour de Japon: Music from Final Fantasy concert series, and in the Video Games Live international concert series. The Advent Children version of "One-Winged Angel" was performed at the Press Start -Symphony of Games- 2007 concerts in Yokohama and Osaka, Japan, while The Black Mages performed "Those Who Fight Further" at the Extra: Hyper Game Music Event 2007 concert in Tokyo on July 7, 2007. A 40-minute symphony in three movements consisting of music from Final Fantasy VII premiered in 2013 as part of the Final Symphony concert series and was recorded a year later by the London Symphony Orchestra at Abbey Road Studios. Independent but officially licensed releases of Final Fantasy VII music have been composed by such groups as Project Majestic Mix, which focuses on arranging video game music. Selections also appear on Japanese remix albums, called dōjin music, and on English remixing websites, such as OverClocked ReMix. On September 14, 2007, the OverClocked ReMix community released an unofficial tribute album titled Voices of the Lifestream, a compilation containing 45 arrangements of Final Fantasy VII music.

"Aerith's Theme" was voted into Classic FM's 2012 Hall of Fame in 16th place out of 300 compositions. Elizabeth Davis of Classic FM (UK) notes that "Aerith's Theme" is "one of the most famous pieces of video game music ever written" and is rooted in romantic music, and that Final Fantasy VII helped introduce "a whole generation to the magic of orchestral music". The remake won the category for best score at The Game Awards 2020.

References

External links
 Square Enix's official music store

Final Fantasy 07
Final Fantasy VII
Final Fantasy 07